The 2004 Hungarian Figure Skating Championships took place on January 17 and 18, 2004 in Budapest. Skaters competed in the disciplines of men's singles, ladies' singles, and ice dancing on the senior level. The results were used to choose the Hungarian teams to the 2004 World Championships and the 2004 European Championships.

Results

Men

Ladies

Ice dancing

External links
 results

Hungarian Figure Skating Championships
Hungarian Figure Skating Championships, 2004
Figure skating